Kaliman can refer to:

Kalimán, a Mexican comic book character
Kaliman I of Bulgaria
Kaliman II of Bulgaria
Kaliman, Iran, a village in Gilan Province